Ashineh (also Romanized as ‘Ashīneh and ‘Ashīneh; also known as Ashnīyeh) is a village in Barzavand Rural District, in the Central District of Ardestan County, Isfahan Province, Iran. At the 2006 census, its population was 42, in 17 families.

References 

Populated places in Ardestan County